Carrie Semmelroth is an American politician and academic serving as a member of the Idaho Senate from the 17th district. She assumed office on November 24, 2021, succeeding Alison Rabe.

Education 
Semmelroth earned a Bachelor of Arts degree in sociology, Master of Science in special education, and Doctor of Education in curriculum and instruction from Boise State University.

Career 
She was previously a candidate for the Idaho House of Representatives in 2014, losing in the Democratic primary to incumbent John Gannon. She works at the Boise State University College of Education.

References 

Living people
Democratic Party Idaho state senators
Boise State University alumni
Boise State University faculty
Women state legislators in Idaho
People from Boise, Idaho
Year of birth missing (living people)